This is a timeline documenting events of Jazz in the year 1974.

Events

April
 5 – The very first Vossajazz started in Voss, Norway (April 5 – 7).

May
 22 – The 2nd Nattjazz started in Bergen, Norway (May 22 – June 5).
 31 – The 3rd Moers Festival started in Moers, Germany (May 31 – June 1).

June
 28
 The 21st Newport Jazz Festival started in Newport, Rhode Island (June 28 – July 7).
 The 8th Montreux Jazz Festival started in Montreux, Switzerland (June 28 – July 7).

September
 20 – The 17th Monterey Jazz Festival started in Monterey, California (September 20 – 22).

Unknown date
 The First International Boogie Woogie Festival at WDR Cologne, Germany, on Sept.14/15 1974, with Memphis Slim, Willie Mabon, Axel Zwingenberger, Bob Hall, Jo-Ann Kelly, Vince Weber among others, organized by Hans W. Ewert for Radio WDR

Album releases

Sam Rivers: Crystals
Cecil Taylor: Silent Tongues
Steve Lacy: Saxophone Special
Jeanne Lee: Conspiracy
Leon Smith: Reflectativity
Weather Report: Mysterious Traveller
Randy Weston: Blues To Africa
Marion Brown: Sweet Earth Flying
Paul Rutherford: The Gentle Harm of the Bourgeoisie
Marvin Peterson: Children of the Fire
John Abercrombie: Timeless
Roswell Rudd: Flexible Flyer
McCoy Tyner: Atlantis
Globe Unity Orchestra: Hamburg '74
Cecil McBee: Mutima
Mahavishnu Orchestra: Apocalypse
Ralph Towner: Solstice
Terje Rypdal: Whenever I Seem To Be Far Away
Roscoe Mitchell: Solo Saxophone Concerts
Steve Kuhn: Ecstasy
Joe McPhee: Pieces of Light
Keith Jarrett: Death and the Flower
Steve Kuhn: Trance
Steve Lacy: Scraps
David Liebman: Drum Ode
Kenny Barron: Peruvian Blue
Tete Montoliu: Music for Perla
Bill Watrous: Manhattan Wildlife Refuge
Lonnie Liston Smith: Expansions
Mike Gibbs: Only Chrome Waterfall
McCoy Tyner: Sama Layuca
Oregon: Winter Light
Billy Cobham: Total Eclipse 
Hugh Masekela: I Am Not Afraid
Miles Davis: Get Up With It
Herbie Hancock: Thrust
Gene Ammons: Brasswind

Deaths

 January
 10 – Eddie Safranski, American upright bassist (born 1918).
 23 – Don Fagerquist, American trumpeter (born 1927).
 26
 Archie Semple, Scottish clarinetist (born 1928).
 Joe Benjamin, American upright bassist. (born 1919).
 28 – Ed Allen, American jazz trumpeter and cornetist (born 1897).

 February
 25 – Julian Dash, American tenor (born 1916).

 March
 1 – Bobby Timmons, American pianist and composer (born 1935).
 9 – Floyd Bean, American jazz pianist (born 1904).
 22 – Sam Donahue, American tenor saxophonist, trumpeter and musical arranger (born 1918).
 27 – Lars Skoglund, Norwegian guitarist, drummer, and composer.

 April
 11 – Fud Candrix, Belgian saxophonist and violinist (born 1908).

 May
 4 – Geraldo, English bandleader and composer (born 1904).
 15 – Paul Gonsalves, American tenor saxophonist (born 1920).
 24 – Duke Ellington, American composer, pianist, and bandleader (born 1899).

August
 6 – Gene Ammons, American tenor saxophonist (born 1925).
 9 – Bill Chase,  American trumpeter (born 1934).
 13 – Tina Brooks, American tenor saxophonist and composer (born 1932).
 21 – Marvin Ash, American pianist (born 1914).
 25 – Gus Viseur, Belgian-French button accordionist (born 1915).

October
 8 – Harry Carney, American saxophonist (born 1910).
 18 – John Anderson, American trumpeter (born 1921).

 November
 19 – George Brunies, American trombonist (born 1902).

Births

 January
 4
 Hild Sofie Tafjord, Norwegian French hornist.
 Sjur Miljeteig, Norwegian trumpeter, composer, and author.

 February
 17 – Bernt Moen, Norwegian pianist, keyboarder, and composer.
 21 – Benjamin Koppel, Danish saxophonist.
 27 – Alexi Tuomarila, Finnish pianist and composer.

 March
 27 – Lars Skoglund, Norwegian composer, guitarist, and drummer.

 April
 10 – Beate S. Lech, Norwegian singer, composer, and lyricist.
 18 – Madeleine Peyroux, American singer-songwriter.
 24 – Niño Josele, Spanish guitarist and exponent of the New Flamenco style.
 29 – Børre Dalhaug, Norwegian drummer.
 30 – Aaron Goldberg, American pianist.

 May
 29 – Coleman Mellett, American jazz guitarist (died 2009).
 30 – Nick Etwell, British trumpeter, The Filthy Six.

 July
 7 – Kenneth Ekornes, Norwegian percussionist.
 10 – Kai Fagaschinski, German clarinetist and composer.
 17 – Laura Macdonald, Scottish alto and soprano saxophonist, composer and teacher.
 22 – Kåre Nymark, Norwegian trumpeter and composer.
 29 – Viktoria Tolstoy, Swedish singer.
 31 – Dafnis Prieto, Cuban-American drummer, composer, bandleader, and educator.

 August
 13 – Magnus Lindgren, Swedish saxophonist, flautist, and clarinetist.

 September
 10 – Lasse Marhaug, Norwegian electronic musician.
 24 – Miriam Aïda, Swedish singer.
 30 – Varre Vartiainen, Finnish guitarist.

 October 
 25 – Victor Kunonga, Zimbabwean singer and songwriter.

 November
 4 – Simon Spillett, English tenor saxophonist.
 23 – Frode Kjekstad, Norwegian guitarist.
 26 – Line Horntveth, Norwegian tubist, flautist, percussionist, and singer, Jaga Jazzist.

 December
 6 – Stefan Pasborg, Danish drummer, composer, and bandleader.
 17 – Anders Aarum, Norwegian pianist and composer.
 21 – Knut Aalefjær, Norwegian drummer.
 24
 Sophie Alour, French saxophonist.
 Paal Nilssen-Love, Norwegian drummer.
 26 – Chihiro Yamanaka, Japanese pianist and composer.

 Unknown date
 Biel Ballester, Spanish guitarist.
 Jonathan Bratoeff, French guitarist.
 Martin Tingvall, Swedish pianist, composer, and bandleader.
 Thomas Toivonen, Swedish-Finnish multi-instrumentalist, independent filmmaker, and activist.

See also

 1970s in jazz
 List of years in jazz
 1974 in music

References

External links 
 History Of Jazz Timeline: 1974 at All About Jazz

Jazz
Jazz by year